G. gardneri may refer to:
 Goniothalamus gardneri, a plant species endemic to Sri Lanka
 Guarea gardneri, a plant species in the genus Guarea

See also 
 Gardneri